Wallingford railway station is a railway station serving the town of Wallingford. It is now part of a preserved railway.

History

For such a short line and a small station, the location was well patronised by commercial freight customers. The original Wallingford creamery was taken over by the Co-op Wholesale Society, and had its own private siding access from the goods yard to allow access for milk trains, which then took product to London until the late 1950s. There was also a Malting plant with rail access.

Passenger services were withdrawn in 1959 and general freight services finished in 1965. When traffic from the maltings stopped in 1981 the line was closed and British Rail removed the junction at Cholsey.

Services

Notes

References

Heritage railway stations in Oxfordshire
Former Great Western Railway stations
Railway stations in Great Britain opened in 1866
Railway stations in Great Britain closed in 1959
Wallingford, Oxfordshire
1866 establishments in England